Josh Simpson (born August 17, 1949 in New Haven, Connecticut) is an American glass artist. His work has been exhibited in numerous galleries around the world, and is held in the collections of museums such as the Corning Museum of Glass; the Museum of Fine Arts, Boston; and the Renwick Gallery.

Career 

Simpson's career began in 1972, when he was a senior at Hamilton College. At the time, seniors were permitted to pursue their own interests during the month of January, so he spent that period practicing glass blowing in Vermont. Simpson became so enamored of working with glass that a month became a year, and while he did return to Hamilton briefly to complete his psychology degree, he has been pursuing this passion ever since.
He is particularly well known for his planets, glass paperweights ranging in size from about an inch in diameter to the 107-pound Megaplanet the Corning Museum of Glass commissioned in 2005. He originally began making planets in the mid-1970s, when he was trying to capture the interest of eighth-graders during glass blowing demonstrations. Inspired by the story of the Apollo astronauts seeing the earth hanging in space like a blue marble, he began creating marble-sized planets for the students. This early inspiration developed into a major artistic direction. In addition to exhibiting and selling these works, Simpson also hides them in various settings across the globe, and even offers the public the opportunity to participate through his Infinity Project.
Other significant portions of Simpson's body of work are formed from materials he refers to as "New Mexico glass" and "Tektite glass". The vibrant blue color of New Mexico glass evokes the night sky in summer, and is also an attempt to duplicate the color of Cherenkov radiation, which Simpson saw while touring nuclear power plants. The Tektite glass is based on a spectrographic analysis Simpson had performed on a natural tektite. He recreated this material in his furnace, discovering in the process that it is very difficult to work. While he uses the New Mexico glass to create elegant platters, bowls, and vases, the greyish-black Tektite glass often resembles lava, seeming to have taken its shape without human intervention.

In 2014, Josh collaborated with Westfield State University and "Westfield on Weekends" to have a nearly year-long celebration of the "Universe according to Josh Simpson". Several gallery exhibits and displays of Josh's work were displayed in Westfield Universities Downtown Art Gallery and The Westfield Anthanaeum. The final big event in the series was "Megaplanet Palooza" a street and music festival held on Westfield's downtown Park Square.

Personal 

Simpson graduated from Kent School in 1968. He is married to the American astronaut Catherine Coleman. He has two children, Josiah and Jamey.

References 

1949 births
Living people
American glass artists
Hamilton College (New York) alumni
Kent School alumni
People from New Haven, Connecticut